Momelotinib (INN, formerly GS-0387, CYT-387) is an inhibitor of Janus kinases JAK1 and JAK2, acting as an ATP competitor with IC50 values of 11 and 18 nM, respectively. The inhibitor is significantly less active towards other kinases, including JAK3 (IC50 = 0.16 μM).

As of 2011, momelotinib is being developed as a drug for myelofibrosis and currently undergoes Phase I/II clinical trials. Additional potential treatment indications for momelotinib include other myeloproliferative neoplasms, cancer (solid and liquid tumors) and inflammatory conditions.

As of 2016, momelotinib is being investigated for primary myelofibrosis or post-polycythemia vera or post-essential thrombocythemia myelofibrosis (post-PV/ET MF), as well as a treatment for relapsed or refractory metastatic pancreatic ductal adenocarcinoma (in combination with capecitabine and oxaliplatin).

Discovery 
The drug was originally discovered by Australian drug discovery company Cytopia, then developed by YM BioSciences Inc. (since acquired by Gilead Sciences as of 2013).

References

External links 
 www.ymbiosciences.com
 https://oncologytube.com/video/41076/momelotinib-a-jak-inhibitor-vs-danazol-in-myelofibrosis?channelName=EHA

Benzamides
4-Morpholinyl compunds
Nitriles
Non-receptor tyrosine kinase inhibitors
Protein kinase inhibitors
Aminopyrimidines
Experimental cancer drugs